From Corleone to Brooklyn (original title: Da Corleone a Brooklyn) is an Italian poliziotteschi film directed by Umberto Lenzi. The film was released in Italy on 13 April 1979 and stars Maurizio Merli, Mario Merola and Van Johnson.

Plot 
Italian police officer Giorgio Berni (Maurizio Merli) is seeking to arrest Michele Barresi (Mario Merola), who is hiding in New York under the name Vito Ferrando, for his role in the murder of Salvetore Santoro. He plans to accomplish this by having a witness to the murder, Salvetore Scalia, testify against Barresi in court as evidence that Barresi was involved in the crime. On their way from Italy to New York Berni and Scalia experience several lethal encounters with Barresi's men trying to prevent them from getting to Barresi.

Assuming that Salvetore Scalia is dead, as a result of a newspaper report put out by the police, Barresi has his sister Liana murdered so as to eliminate all witnesses to the murder of Santoro. While searching Liana's apartment, police find a plane ticket for New York. While leaving Liana's apartment a shootout breaks out between Barresi's men and Berni, resulting in the death of Giuseppe Caruso, and revealing that Salvetore Scalia is alive. In order to secure a safe hiding spot for Scalia, Berni takes him to the house of his ex-wife, Paola. After leaving Paola's house another firefight ensues with Barresi's men. Poala, Berni, and Scalia then stay in a hotel for the night. As they head to the airport the following day, the road is blocked by Barresi's men, where Berni commands Paola to speed through their barrier. From here, Berni and Scalia take a plane to New York.

According to plan Scalia and Berni take refuge in a hotel the evening before they plan to testify against Barresi. After realizing that the man guarding the door is missing, Berni must take Scalia somewhere else to hide. He takes him to Joe's Restaurant and Pizzeria, where the head of the restaurant, Luigi, allows them to hide in his apartment upstairs. Meanwhile, two of Barresi's men enter the restaurant aiming to murder Berni and Scalia. However, a group of robbers enter immediately after, prompting Barresi's men to engage in shootout with the robbers, then flee the scene. Berni and Scalia exit Joe's Restaurant to track down the two men who left the restaurant, but are instead ambushed by a street gang. Police arrive to the scene of the ambush, where they arrest Berni and Scalia after receiving a report of two dangerous men, one armed, in the area. They do not initially believe that Berni is an Italian police officer. After Berni convinces them to take him to Lieutenant Sturges, who is sitting on the court case of Barresi, Berni and Scalia are free to begin their testimony against Barresi. When Scalia takes the stand to testify against Barresi, however, he claims that he does not know the man and has never seen him in his life, causing the judge to order Barresi to be set free.

Outside the court house, Scalia is shot dead by a gunman on the roof, revealed to be a clerk working at the hotel in which Berni and Scalia stayed when they first arrived in New York. The film ends with Berni searching Scalia's jacket pockets and finding a note stating that, if he were to die, let it be known that the man who goes by Vito Ferrando is actually Michele Barresi, providing Berni with the evidence he needs to bring Barresi down.

Cast
 Maurizio Merli as Commissioner Giorgio Berni
 Mario Merola as Michele Barresi
 Biagio Pelligra as  Salvatore Scalia
 Laura Belli as Paola
 Van Johnson as Lt. Sturges
 Venantino Venantini as Commissioner Danova
 Sonia Viviani as Liana Scalia 
 Salvatore Billa as Giuseppe Caruso
 Luca Barbareschi as Policeman

Release
From Corleone to Brooklyn was released theatrically in Italy on 13 April 1979, distributed by Variety Film. The film grossed 398.6 million Italian lira.

See also 
 List of Italian films of 1979

References

Footnotes

Sources

External links

From Corleone to Brooklyn at Variety Distribution

1979 films
1970s crime thriller films
Italian crime thriller films
1970s Italian-language films
Films about the Sicilian Mafia
Films set in Italy
Films set in the United States
Films set in New York City
Films directed by Umberto Lenzi
1970s Italian films